Joshua C. Stoddard (August 26, 1814 in Pawlet, Vermont – April 4, 1902) was an American inventor. He was educated at the public schools, and became noted as an apiarist. He also turned his attention to inventing, and on October 9, 1855, patented the steam calliope, used on Mississippi River steamboats. It was originally known as a "steam piano", with Stoddard forming the American Steam Piano Company [sometimes referred to as the American Steam Music Company] in Worcester, Massachusetts. The Worcester City Council banned him from playing it within the city limits because it was so loud.

He also invented the Stoddard horse-rake, patented in 1879. More than 100,000 of his rakes were produced. Other inventions included a fruit-paring machine, a hay-tedder and a fire escape system, patented 1884.

References

19th-century American inventors
American beekeepers
1814 births
1902 deaths
American people of Québécois descent